"Good Mourning" is the first episode and the season premiere of the sixth season of the American television medical drama Grey's Anatomy, and the show's 103rd episode overall. It was written by Krista Vernoff and directed by Ed Ornelas. The episode was originally broadcast on the American Broadcasting Company (ABC) in the United States on September 24, 2009. In "Good Mourning", the physicians are seen dealing with the revelation that a dead John Doe is their beloved co-worker Dr. George O'Malley (T. R. Knight), and dealing with the aftermath of Dr. Izzie Stevens' (Katherine Heigl) near-death experience. Further storylines include Dr. Callie Torres (Sara Ramirez) and Stevens trying to decide whether or not to donate O'Malley's organs and Dr. Derek Shepherd      (Patrick Dempsey) being offered Dr. Richard Webber's (James Pickens, Jr.) chief of surgery job.

The episode was the first part of the 2-hour season 6 premiere, the second being "Goodbye", and took place at the fictional Seattle Grace Hospital. "Good Mourning" was the first episode that Knight did not appear in, following an early release from his contract, and Jessica Capshaw's (Dr. Arizona Robbins) first episode in which she received star-billing, having been upgraded from a recurring-star. Mitch Pileggi reprised his role as a guest star, in addition to Debra Monk, Shannon Lucio and Zoe Boyle. "Good Mourning" opened to positive critical reviews, with particular praise directed towards Ramirez's performance. The original episode broadcast was ranked at #1 for the night with in the United States 17.03 million viewers, and a 6.7/17 Nielsen rating/share in the 18–49 demographic.

Plot
The episode opens to a voice-over narrative from Dr. Meredith Grey (Ellen Pompeo), explaining the Kübler-Ross model, that is the 5 stages of grief. At the conclusion of season 5's finale, Dr. Izzie Stevens (Katherine Heigl) and Dr. George O'Malley (T. R. Knight) both flatlined, from cancer and being dragged by a bus, respectively, and the opening of the episode reveals Stevens to have been revived, while O'Malley has been pronounced brain dead. O'Malley's former wife Dr. Callie Torres (Sara Ramirez) informs her colleagues that he has died, and suffers an emotional breakdown, hyperventilating. O'Malley's death had been implied in the first episode when he asks "We're gonna survive this, right?" with Grey answering nothing.

It is unknown whether or not O'Malley is an organ donor, and the chief of surgery Dr. Richard Webber (James Pickens, Jr.) calls O'Malley's mother, Louise          (Debra Monk), as she is his next of kin. Following Stevens's resuscitation, she is unaware that O'Malley has died, and her husband Dr. Alex Karev (Justin Chambers) decides not to tell her, with fear that she might go into circulatory shock and lose consciousness again. Pediatric surgeon Dr. Arizona Robbins           (Jessica Capshaw) is introduced to a patient, with body pain, whom she diagnoses with growing pains.

Louise O'Malley arrives at the hospital, and asks Torres to decide if O'Malley's organs will be donated. The victim of a speedboat accident, Clara Ferguson (Zoe Boyle), arrives at the hospital in an ambulance, with both of her arms and one of her legs amputated. She is attended to by plastic surgeon Dr. Mark Sloan (Eric Dane), who informs her that her cut-off arms can be reattached. The hospital's president, Larry Jennings (Mitch Pileggi), explains to neurosurgeon Dr. Derek Shepherd (Patrick Dempsey) that Webber has not been substantially completing his role as chief of surgery, and offers Shepherd the job. Karev reveals O'Malley's death to Stevens, and Torres seeks her help in deciding whether or not to donate O'Malley's organs. Stevens opinionates that O'Malley would give all his organs, and the two come to a mutual conclusion that donation is the correct option. Prior to the harvesting of his organs, O'Malley's former mentor Dr. Miranda Bailey (Chandra Wilson) is uneasy about donating his organs, but soon comes to terms with the situation. Several days later, at O'Malley's funeral, the woman O'Malley saved, Amanda (Shannon Lucio) is shown hysterically crying while Karev, Stevens, Meredith, and Dr. Cristina Yang (Sandra Oh) are laughing—unable to deal with their true emotions. After the funeral, O'Malley's former best friend Dr. Lexie Grey (Chyler Leigh) is designated the job of emptying out his locker, but breaks down. Bailey subsequently discharges Stevens, and Robbins's body pain patient returns, with chronic pain, though Robbins is unable to diagnose him. Torres approaches Webber, seeking information as to whether or not her application to become an attending surgeon has been accepted. Webber explains that the job is no longer available, as the surgeon who was going to retire, ultimately did not. Torres becomes enraged, saying that the current surgeon who has the job is a dinosaur, and storms out while yelling: "I'm a superstar". The episode closes with Lexie consoling the speedboat victim, Ferguson.

Production

"Good Mourning" was written by Krista Vernoff and directed by Ed Ornelas. Joe Mitacek edited the episode and Donald Lee Harris served as production designer. Featured music includes Sweet Honey in the Rock's "Wade In The Water" and Joy Williams's "Speaking A Dead Language". "Good Mourning" is the first episode not to feature Knight's character, George O'Malley. Knight was released from his contract at the conclusion of season 5, following a disagreement with series creator Shonda Rhimes over lack of screen-time for his character. When asked to make a 'flashback' appearance in season 6, Knight declined.

Vernoff offered her thoughts on the death of O'Malley: "It's heartbreaking. I fell in love with George, like many of you did, in season 1. He was impulsive, big-hearted, and yeah, it's that heart that had him jump in front of a moving bus to save a life. It's a devastating end to a beloved character, but I would argue with anyone who said it wasn't a fitting end." In the episode, Shepherd was offered the position of chief of surgery, but postponed his decision, due to Webber being his friend. Vernoff offered her insight on this: 

The scene in which O'Malley's colleagues were laughing at his funeral was one of Vernoff's favorite scenes. She added: "Shonda gave me smart notes that enhanced the writing and then the wonderful director Ed Ornelas and the amazing DP Herb Davis and the whole crew that support them made it visually beautiful and then the actors… damn, did they all bring their A game to this scene. And then there are the editors and music folks and the people who color correct everything and mix the sound… It's a collaboration. What it takes to make good TV is a huge coming together of a great many artists. What it takes to make great TV is all that plus a little magic and a little luck. And that’s what I feel like we had with this scene. It's so funny and so bittersweet and so, so sad."

Reception

Broadcasting 
"Good Mourning" was originally broadcast on September 24, 2009, on the American Broadcasting Company (ABC) in the United States. It was viewed by a total of 17.04 million people, in its 9:00 Eastern time-slot. The episode was the series' second least-viewed season premiere, up to that point, just ahead of the season 1 premiere—"A Hard Day's Night". In comparison to the previous episode, "Good Mourning" made a 0.08% decrease in terms of viewership. However, the episode's viewership ranked first in both its time-slot and the entire night, beating out CBS's juggernaut CSI. In addition to being a success in viewership, the episode also did well in ratings. "Good Mourning"'s 6.7/17 Nielsen rating ranked first in its time-slot and the entire night, for both the rating and share percentages of the 18–49 demographic. The episode also received a rating of 10.9/18 in the 18-34 demographic, beating out CBS's The Mentalist, and ranking #1 in the ratings and shares for the demographic.

Critical Reception 

The episode opened to positive critical reviews, and aired back-to-back with the next episode, "Goodbye", as a 2-hour season premiere special. Alan Sepinwall of NJ.com commented on the 2 episodes being conjoined into 1 week: "I keep going back and forth on whether it was a good idea to do that, or if we'd have been better off spacing out the tearful speeches over 2 weeks. That isn't to say that there shouldn't have been tears, or speeches. George's death, no matter how marginal he had become last season, is and should be a huge event in the lives of these characters. Had the show raced through Elizabeth Kubler-Ross's famous 5 stages of grief, it would have rang false, as if everyone making the show was in a hurry to move past the events of the wildly-uneven fifth season. My problem is, when you put 2 episodes back-to-back, those rhythms - the pace at which the acts build to emotional crescendos and then briefly recede - start to become too predictable, and it sucks some of the life and emotion away." Sepinwall also praised Wilson's, Ramirez's, and Chambers' performances, in addition to the laughing at O'Malley's funeral.

Michael Pascua of The Huffington Post also praised Ramirez's performance, calling her "the most genuine character". Although he enjoyed Ramirez's performance, Pascua was critical of the rest of the episode, writing: "The funeral wasn't as sad as I thought it would be. There were so many pre-episode pictures up that I thought the funeral would take up half the show, then it was 5 minutes and it wasn't sad at all. The core-group walked away and Izzie spread the giggles. She laughs at the fact that she has cancer, like this was all some really badly-written show. Oh wait, it is!"

Kelly West of TV Blend was also critical of the episode, writing: "I don't think based on the first episode that we can say that Grey's is headed in a new direction, nor do I think the writers are making much of an effort to bring the series back to the greatness that were its earlier seasons. That said, this is Grey's Anatomy and with that comes the usual drama, sex, love and whacky medical mysteries thrown in the mix to keep things moving. If that's what you’re looking for, I think you'll enjoy the season premiere just fine." Glenn Diaz of BuddyTV noted that the special foreshadowed a "very dark" season, adding: "The talk between George's mom and one of the surgeons [Torres] proved to be one of the more heart-breaking scenes in an episode, that in itself is heartbreaking enough."

References

External links
"Good Mourning" at ABC.com

2009 American television episodes
Grey's Anatomy (season 6) episodes
Television episodes about funerals